Xiao Lu (Chinese: 肖鲁, born 1962) is a Chinese artist who works with installation art and video art. She became famous in 1989, when she participated in the 1989 China/Avant-Garde Exhibition with her work, Dialogue. Just two hours after the exhibition opened, she suddenly shot her own work with a gun, causing an immediate shutdown of the exhibition. When the Tiananmen Square massacre occurred four months later, her actions were heavily politicized, referred to as “the first gunshots of Tiananmen”.

Early life and education 
Xiao Lu was born in Hangzhou, China, in April 1962. She came from a revolutionary family with both of her parents being Socialist Realist artists; a tradition that she rebelled against.

In July 1984, Xiao Lu graduated from Beijing's Central Academy of Fine Arts Middle School.

In 1988 she graduated from the Oil Painting department of the Zhejiang Academy of Fine Arts in Hangzhou, where she was the daughter of the President of the academy.

In her 2010 novel Dialogue (2010), Xiao Lu reveals that she was sexually abused by a guardian trusted by her parents who came from the older generation of Socialist Realist art. She states that she telephoned this man not long after shooting her artwork Dialogue in 1989, although has not confirmed whether or not he is related to her decision to shoot the artwork.

The China/Avant-Garde Exhibition 1989 
Preparations for the China/Avant-Garde Exhibition began in 1986. It was the first time that an art exhibition for contemporary Chinese artists had been organized and curated solely by Chinese organizers. After having been postponed in 1987 by the launch of the Chinese Communist Party's political movement, “Against Bourgeois Liberalization”, the exhibition finally received official permission to open at the National Art Museum of China in Beijing on the 5th of February 1989.

At around 11:10 am on the 5th of February 1989 – two hours after the China/Avant-Garde Exhibition opened – Xiao Lu fired two shots into her own work, Dialogue, with a gun. The exhibition was immediately closed after the gunshot by the officials of the museum. Xiao Lu and Tang Song were arrested.

The Tiananmen Square massacre occurred just four months later, on June 4, 1989. After the incident, Xiao Lu's gunshots became incredibly politicized, referred to as “the first gunshots of Tiananmen”, and the China Avant-Garde Exhibition described as “the little Tiananmen Square”. The reason for this reaction is that, against the political landscape at the time, the China/Avant-Garde Exhibition was a controversial call for democracy, and Xiao Lu's gunshots were incredibly provocative both for the National Art Museum of China and for the official authorities. However, she was regarded as a hero and an inspirational figure by the political and cultural activists in China at that time. She was the first female artist having such achievements in the severely sexist Chinese art community.

Xiao Lu was detained after her gunshot and eventually managed to get to Australia where she made money making portraits for tourists and became a naturalized Australian citizen.

Dialogue (1989) 
Xiao Lu's infamous work at the China/Avant-Garde Exhibition, Dialogue (1989), shows a man and a woman talking to each other in phone booths; between them is a red phone with its receiver dangling off the hook. Dialogue (1989) could be called China's first major feminist contemporary work of art.

According to Gao Minglu, the principal curator, no one on the exhibition committee knew about the gunshots beforehand.

There has been great discussion and confusion about Xiao Lu's actual intentions with the gunshots after their occurrence. As Xiao Lu and her partner Tang Song were both detained immediately afterward, there was no way to know their true intentions. The only indication was a document signed by Xiao Lu and her then-partner Tang Song, given to Gao Minglu after the shooting and preserved by her. It reads:“As parties to the shooting incident on the day of the opening of the China Avant-garde Exhibition, we consider it a purely artistic incident. We consider that in art, there may be artists with different understandings of society, but as artists we are not interested in politics. We are interested in the values of art as such, and in its social value, and in using the right form with which to create, in order to carry out the process of deepening that understanding.Xiao Lu, Tang Song”It remained unclear, however, why the shooting happened, if Tang Song also participated or planned it, and if it was intended to be a part of the artwork or not. Most people regarded the shooting as a performance piece created by Xiao Lu and Tang Song.

In 2004, Xiao Lu confirmed with Gao Minglu that she was the unique creator of the gunshot incident, revising previous accounts that saw her and Tang Song as co-authors of the artwork. This revision angered the Chinese art world, and many saw her revision as unnecessary and as just blowing off emotional steam due to her break-up with Tang Song.

In an interview in the Sydney Morning Herald in 2014, Xiao Lu clarified that her reasons for the gunshots were not political, but also embraced the political interpretations of them, stating, “I created the work out of personal feelings, but this work became interpreted with political meanings…I don't reject this. I've come to understand that with this work, making it for myself is one thing, but how it is interpreted is also a big part of it.”

Later work 
After staying in Australia for nine years (1989-1997), Xiao Lu returned to her hometown of Hangzhou in 1997 and continued to create art up until now.

Xiao Lu's artwork Sperm (2006) consists of an installation piece and a documentary-style video chronicling her search for a sperm donor after a split from her longtime partner and a strong desire to have a baby. As Chinese women were not allowed IVF treatment if they weren't married, she consulted a Western doctor who promised to perform the procedure if she could collect and freeze the sperm. The work documents her ultimate failure to fulfill this requirement.

Her project Wedding (2009) is a performance and recorded video of marrying herself. She started with lying in a black coffin and were held by four young men out of the car and into the museum. After finishing all the oaths, she put on a pair of wedding rings on her left and right hands respectively and declared her marriage with herself.

In 2010, Xiao Lu published a novel named after her most famous work, Dialogue (2010), which was presented as a fictitious tale based on real-life people and events.

Her artwork Love Letter (2011) is an installation piece composed of charcoal and Chinese herbal medicine, which she took to keep herself healthy during her pregnancy. She wrote down her inner thoughts and sentiments on pieces of xuan paper, each taking the form of a secret.

References 

Artists from Hangzhou
1962 births
Living people